Arotrophora paiana is a species of moth of the family Tortricidae. It is found in India, where it has been recorded from the Khasi Hills.

The wingspan is about 21 mm. The ground colour of forewings is creamish, preserved as a basal spot at the costa, radial striae and a few dots along the termen and costa. The remaining area is suffused brownish and greyish brown in the costal area. The hindwings are brownish.

References

Moths described in 2009
Arotrophora
Moths of Asia